Cymindis olegiana is a species of ground beetle in the subfamily Harpalinae. It was described by Kabak in 1999.

References

olegiana
Beetles described in 1999